James Darrell Scott, known as Darrell Scott (born August 6, 1959), is an American singer-songwriter and multi-instrumentalist.  The son of musician Wayne Scott, he moved as a child to East Gary, Indiana (known today as Lake Station, Indiana). He was playing professionally by his teens in Southern California. Later, Darrell moved to Toronto then Boston. He attended Tufts University, where he studied poetry and literature. He has lived in Nashville, Tennessee since about 1995.  He has written several mainstream country hits, and he has also established himself as one of Nashville's premier session instrumentalists.  His younger brother, David Scott, occasionally accompanies Darrell on the keyboard.

Musical career

Scott has collaborated with Steve Earle, Sam Bush, Emmylou Harris, John Cowan, Verlon Thompson, Guy Clark, Tim O'Brien, Kate Rusby, Jimmie Dale Gilmore, Mary Gauthier, Dan Tyminski, and many others.  His music has attracted a growing fanbase, and he tours regularly with his own band.  His album, Crooked Road, was released May 25, 2010.
In early 2005, Scott's Theatre of the Unheard won in The 4th Annual Independent Music Awards for Album of the Year.

He won the 2007 Song of the Year award from the Americana Music Association for his song "Hank William's Ghost" which appears on his album The Invisible Man released in 2006.

In 2010, he was announced as part of the Band of Joy, alongside Robert Plant, credited as performing vocals, mandolin, guitar, accordion, pedal, lap steel and banjo.

In 2010, Brad Paisley's cover of the song "You'll Never Leave Harlan Alive" was the closing song played on the TV drama Justified during the final scene of the final episode of the first season. It was used again in the final episode of the second season. The fourth season's final episode used a version by Dave Alvin. The fifth season's final episode used a version by the Ruby Friedman Orchestra. The final episode of the series featured the original composition by Darrell Scott himself.

In January 2011, his album A Crooked Road won the award for the Country Album category from The 10th Annual Independent Music Awards.

Songs by Darrell Scott covered by other musicians

 "It's a Great Day to Be Alive" – Travis Tritt, Cory Morrow
 "You'll Never Leave Harlan Alive" – Montgomery Gentry, Brad Paisley, Patty Loveless, Kathy Mattea, Murder By Death (band), Red Molly, Dave Alvin, Ruby Friedman Orchestra, Maxida Märak, Jonah Michea Judy, and Downhill Bluegrass Band
 "Long Time Gone" – The Chicks
 "We've Got Nothing But Love to Prove" – Faith Hill
 "Proving You Wrong" – Keb' Mo'
 "Out In The Parking Lot" – Guy Clark, Brad Paisley with Alan Jackson
 "River Take Me" – Montgomery Gentry, Sam Bush
 "Heartbreak Town" – The Chicks
 "Head South" – Robinella
 "Family Tree" – Darryl Worley
 "With A Memory Like Mine" – John Cowan, Mountain Heart
 "Love's Not Through With Me Yet" – Johnsmith
 "Daddy Lessons" – Beyoncé (remix with The Chicks sampled Long Time Gone)
 "It's Another Day" - Tim O'Brien on Traveler

Singles composed with others
"Born to Fly" – Sara Evans

Discography

Awards

References

External links
 Official Website
 
 
 "Wayne and Darrell Scott: Father-Son Country", Fresh Air from WHYY-FM, July 3, 2006
  WoodSongs Old-Time Radio Hour, Archive, see episodes #103, #109, #326, #584
 Darrell Scott's audio series released each new moon
 Songwriting courses taught by Darrell Scott

American country guitarists
American male guitarists
American country singer-songwriters
American multi-instrumentalists
American male singer-songwriters
Tufts University alumni
American mandolinists
Real World Records artists
Living people
People from London, Kentucky
Independent Music Awards winners
1959 births
Country musicians from Kentucky
Singer-songwriters from Kentucky
Guitarists from Kentucky
20th-century American guitarists
Band of Joy members
20th-century American male musicians